Maples Collegiate is a public high school in Winnipeg, Manitoba. It is a part of the Seven Oaks School Division.  The Maples Met High School is located in the same building as the regular high school.

Notable alumni
 Tanya Dubnicoff, medalist in track cycling
 Justin Duff, Canadian volleyball player
 Krzysztof Soszynski, UFC fighter

References

External links
 Seven Oaks School Division
 Maples Collegiate Institute

High schools in Winnipeg
Educational institutions established in 1980
1980 establishments in Manitoba

Seven Oaks, Winnipeg